National Highway 727BB, commonly referred to as NH 727BB is a national highway in India. It is a secondary route of National Highway 27.  NH-727BB runs in the state of Uttar Pradesh in India.

Route 
NH727BB connects Gorakhpur and Partawal in the state of Uttar Pradesh.

Junctions  
 
  Terminal near Gorakhpur.
  Terminal near Partawal.

See also 
 List of National Highways in India
 List of National Highways in India by state

References

External links 

 NH 727BB on OpenStreetMap

National highways in India
National Highways in Uttar Pradesh